The 921 Earthquake Museum of Taiwan is a national museum in Wufeng District, Taichung, Taiwan. The museum is dedicated to the 7.3 earthquake that struck the center of Taiwan at 01:47:12.6 TST on Tuesday, 21 September 1999.

The museum is located on the site of the former ; the shell of the building forms the exterior walls of the museum and the Museum's Chelungpu Fault Gallery crosses the fault on which the earthquake occurred.

History
After the earthquake, the local government decided to preserve some of the remains from the earthquake to serve as reminders to the public for them to be prepared in the future if such event happens again. The museum, previously known as the Earthquake Memorial Museum, opened on Tuesday, 13 February 2001.

Galleries
 Chelungpu Fault Gallery
 Earthquake Engineering Hall
 Image Gallery
 Disaster Prevention Hall
 Reconstruction Records Hall

Opening time
The museum is open every day except Mondays from 9.00 a.m. to 5.00 p.m. for the galleries and 6.00 a.m. to 10.00 p.m. for the outdoor sections.

See also 
 List of museums in Taiwan
 National Museum of Natural Science
 Chelungpu Fault Preservation Park

References

External links 

 921 Earthquake Museum of Taiwan (中文)‧(English)‧(日本語)
 

2001 establishments in Taiwan
Natural history museums in Taiwan
Museums established in 2001
Museums in Taichung
Earthquake museums
1999 Jiji earthquake